Brianne Kimmel is a Ukrainian-American venture capitalist and angel investor. She is the founder and managing partner of Worklife Ventures, a venture capital firm she founded in 2019.

Early life and education 
Kimmel is originally from Ukraine but grew up in Youngstown, Ohio. She earned a degree in journalism from Kent State University.

Career 
 
After graduation, Kimmel went to Sydney where she worked at an advertising agency. She later moved back to the United States where she worked for Expedia and taught classes at General Assembly. Prior to launching Worklife, Kimmel led Zendesk's go-to-market strategy, creating the Zendesk for Startups program. She developed the concept for a venture capital fund while working at Zendesk.  
 
Kimmel launched Worklife Ventures in 2019, raising $5 million in capital. An additional $35 million was raised in 2022 with the total market cap of all portfolio companies in the fund reaching $40 billion value the same year.

References

External links 
 Official website

Year of birth missing (living people)
Living people
American people of Ukrainian descent
Venture capitalists
Kent State University alumni